The Geumgang River is located in South Korea. It is a major river that originates in Jangsu-eup, North Jeolla Province. It flows northward through North Jeolla and North Chungcheong Provinces and then changes direction in the vicinity of Greater Daejeon and flows southwest through South Chungcheong Province before emptying into the Yellow Sea near Gunsan city.

The upper part of the river flows slowly through part of the Noryeongsanmaek Mountains and is marked by extensive stream meandering. On the other hand, river curves on middle and lower parts of the river are more gradual and there is comparatively less stream meandering.

Tributary streams of the Geumgang include the Gap-cheon, Yugu-cheon, Miho-cheon, Unsan-cheon, Seokseong-cheon, and Nonsan-cheon. Several small alluvial plains including the Honam and Nonsan Plain have been formed by the flow of the Geumgang and its tributaries.

History and Culture
In the area of Buyeo County, the river bears the name Baengma-gang river, which means White Horse River.  Numerous legends associate the ancient kingdom of Baekje with the Baengma.  The Baengma River is the subject of a well-known song of the sin minyo tradition, Kkumkkuneun Baengma-gang (꿈꾸는 백마강, "Dreaming Baengma-gang").

The Geumgang River and its tributaries were a means of cultural contact from prehistoric times (see Mumun Pottery Period) and into the Three Kingdoms of Korea through their ancient function as a transportation route that begins on the west coast and penetrates deep in the interior of the Peninsula. Bronze Culture flourished in this area from c. 850 B.C.-A.D. 100 (see Liaoning bronze dagger culture). Archaeological evidence suggests that some of the very first complex societies in southern Korea briefly flourished in the valleys formed by tributaries of this river.

The Geumgang River Basin contained the chiefdoms of Mahan, and a former centres of the early kingdom of Baekje such as Ungjin (AD 475–525) and Sabi (AD 525–660) are located along the Baengma portion of the river.

The river's Korean name ("Silk River") is a homonym of the word for "diamond" (금강; 金剛) and should not be confused with Kŭmgang Mountain (금강산; 金剛山; "Diamond Mountain") in North Korea.

Economy
Dams have been built on the Middle and Upper Geumgang to facilitate water for agriculture and industry. They include the Daecheong Dam and the Yongdam Dam. The city of Greater Daejeon and the farms and industries of South Chungcheong Province rely heavily on the Geum River and its tributaries.

The alluvial plains formed by the Geumgang and its tributaries are the locations of significant agricultural production in Korea.

See also
Rivers of Asia
Rivers of Korea
Geography of South Korea

Notes

References

Citations

Bibliography
 .

Rivers of North Chungcheong Province
Rivers of South Chungcheong Province
Rivers of North Jeolla Province
Rivers of Daejeon
Rivers of Sejong City